Pleśnik  is a village in the administrative district of Gmina Bisztynek, within Bartoszyce County, Warmian-Masurian Voivodeship, in northern Poland.

The village has a population of 92.

References

Villages in Bartoszyce County